Avant House may refer to:

Avant House (Andalusia, Alabama), listed on the National Register of Historic Places
Avant House (Mashpee, Massachusetts), listed on the National Register of Historic Places

Architectural disambiguation pages